Zy Kher Lee (born 30 September 2006) is a Malaysian Para swimming athlete. He has competed in the 2021 Asian Youth Para Games in swimming events and get three medals.

References

External links
 

People from Penang
Living people
2006 births